The 1997 Croatian local elections were held on 13 April. This was first local elections in Croatia after the end of war and unification of the territory. In the area of Eastern Slavonia, Baranja and Western Syrmia the elections were conducted with the support and supervision of the United Nations Transitional Administration for Eastern Slavonia, Baranja and Western Sirmium.

Electoral system 
Regional and local self-government elections are conducted in such a way that three quarters of the members of county, city and municipal councils are elected through a joint list covering the entire local self-government unit. The electoral threshold is 5% for parties running independently, for a two-party coalition it is 8% and for a coalition of three or more parties 11%. The remaining quarter through individual constituencies. If two or more candidates receive the same number of votes, the election shall be repeated in that constituency. According to the law, in the first elections, municipalities and towns up to 10,000 inhabitants elect 20 councilors, municipalities and towns up to 20,000 inhabitants elect 25 councilors, cities up to 40,000 inhabitants elect 30 councilors, cities up to 100,000 inhabitants elect 40 councilors and cities with over 100,000 inhabitants elect 45 councilors same as counties. Inhabitants of Zagreb elect 50 councilors in the City Assembly of Zagreb. City and municipality mayors as well as county prefects are elected by the city, municipality and county council. The number of seats can differ from above mentioned because of special seats for national minorities that are given independently.

Elections in the area under the United Nations administration 
In the area of Eastern Slavonia, Baranja and Western Syrmia the elections were conducted with the support and supervision of the United Nations Transitional Administration for Eastern Slavonia, Baranja and Western Sirmium. Successful organization of the elections was precondition for the establishment of the new Croatian local institutions in the region and for the closure of the parallel Serb regional Assembly by May 1, 1997 and the Executive Council (government) before the establishment of the Joint Council of Municipalities. Parallel Serb regional Assembly invited citizens to participate in the election only 48 hours ahead while UNTAES permitted voter registration until April 12 which were some of the factors contributing to weak organization forcing UNTAES to prolong the elections in the region for a couple of days. Ahead of the elections, local parallel institutions organized the 1997 Eastern Slavonia integrity referendum whose failure nevertheless haven't significantly influenced local population's participation in the elections.

Election results

Counties

Cities

1 Complete data not available. The numbers in parentheses represent the total number of available seats.

Elections in capital 
1997 Zagreb local elections

References

1997 elections in Croatia
1997